The Last Harvest: Paintings of Rabindranath Tagore is a book on Rabindranath Tagore (1861–1941) and his paintings edited by R. Siva Kumar. In 2011 it was produced in conjunction with the traveling exhibition The Last Harvest: Paintings of Rabindranath Tagore.

Exhibition

The book was produced in conjunction with the traveling exhibition of Rabindranath Tagore's paintings as part of India's National Commemoration of the 150th Birth Anniversary of Rabindranath Tagore, organised by India's Ministry of Culture.

Contents
 Rabindranath Tagore – A Biographical Sketch
 Rabindranath Tagore's Santiniketan – Where Life and Art Meet
 Rabindranath Tagore's First Ever Exhibition in Paris
 Rabindranath Tagore's Paintings in German
 Stella Kramrisch and the Bauhaus in Calcutta
 Tagore's Sense of Rhythm
 Rabindrasangeet – Rabindranath Tagore's Musical Legacy
 Engagement with Modernity – Paintings of Rabindranath Tagore in the National Gallery of Modern Art, Delhi

Contributors
The book was edited by R. Siva Kumar, with contributions by France Bhattacharya, Uma Das Gupta, Martin Kampchen, Lars-Christian Koch, Rajeev Lochan, Kris K. Manjapra, Kathleen O'Connell and William Radice.

See also
 Rabindra Chitravali – a 2011 publication in 4 volumes on Tagore's paintings, edited by R. Siva Kumar

References

Art history books
Case studies
Works about art genres
Works about ideologies
Books by R. Siva Kumar
Works about Rabindranath Tagore
2011 non-fiction books